Karagay is a rural locality (a selo) and the administrative center of Karagaysky District of Perm Krai, Russia, located on the Obva River. Population: 

Its name is of the Turkic origin and translates from the Bashkir language as "pine" or "pine forest". It was first mentioned in 1623 as a village of six households. It serves as the administrative center of the district since 1923.

References

Rural localities in Karagaysky District
Okhansky Uyezd